Thelacantha (Asian spinybacked orbweaver) is a genus of orb-weaver spiders containing the single species, Thelacantha brevispina. It was first described by A. W. M. van Hasselt in 1882, and has been found in Australia, Madagascar, and across southern Asia from India to Philippines, including Japan. It has also been introduced into Hawaii. T. brevispina is closely related those in the genus Gasteracantha, and was briefly synonymized with it in 1859, but revalidated in 1974. Saito described three other Thelacantha species in 1933, which were later synonymized with T. brevispina.

Description
Females have six abdominal spines ending in distinct sharp points. Most have two large white spots on the upper surface of their abdomens, which are otherwise mottled with black, brown, and white patterns.

Taxonomy
T. brevispina has often been misidentified as Gasteracantha mammosa, which is now G. cancriformis. It has gone through a checkered name history, with many synonyms:

Gasteracantha alba Vinson, 1863
Gasteracantha borbonica Vinson, 1863
Plectana brevispina Doleschall, 1857
Gasteracantha brevispina (Doleschall, 1857)
Thelacantha brevispina (Doleschall, 1857)
Gasteracantha canningensis Stoliczka, 1869
Sitticus distinguendus Fontana et al., 1996
Attulus distinguendus (Fontana et al., 1996)
Plectana flavida Doleschall, 1859
Gasteracantha flavida (Doleschall, 1859)
Gasteracantha formosana Saitō, 1933
Gasteracantha guttata Thorell, 1859
Stanneoclavis latronum Simon, 1890
Actinacantha maculata Karsch, 1878
Gasteracantha mammeata Thorell, 1859
Gasteracantha mastoidea L. Koch, 1872
Stanneoclavis mastoidea (L. Koch, 1872)
Gasteracantha observatrix O. Pickard-Cambridge, 1879
Plectana roseolimbata Doleschall, 1859
Gasteracantha sola Saitō, 1933
Gasteracantha sparsa Saitō, 1933
Gasteracantha suminata L. Koch, 1871
Stanneoclavis suminata (L. Koch, 1871)

See also
 Gasteracantha cancriformis

References

External links

Spiders of Madagascar
Spiders of Asia
Spiders of Australia
Araneidae
Monotypic Araneomorphae genera